Peter Kenrick Florence CBE (born 4 October 1964) is a British festival director, most notable for founding the Hay Festival with his father and mother, Norman Florence and Rhoda Lewis, funding the first festival with winnings from a poker game.

Education and career
Peter Florence was educated at Ipswich School, Jesus College, Cambridge, and the University of Paris and has an MA in Modern and Medieval Literatures. He holds honorary doctorates from The Open University, Queen Mary University of London, Worcester University and The University of Glamorgan, and is a Fellow of Hereford College of Arts, The Royal Welsh College of Music & Drama and the British-American Project, and an Honorary Fellow of Bangor University and of Cardiff University.

He was made a "Colombiano de Corazon" by President Álvaro Uribe for his work in Colombia.

As well as the Hay Festival, Florence founded similar festivals around the world in Mantua, Segovia, the Alhambra Palace, Cartagena, Nairobi, Zacatecas, Thiruvananthapuram, Dhaka, Xalapa, Belfast and Paraty.

He is the co-editor of the Oxtales and Oxtravels anthologies with Mark Ellingham of Profile Books, in partnership with Oxfam. He is a Friend of Oxfam.

He has written for a number of publications including Index on Censorship, The Guardian, The Telegraph and The Spectator.

A number of his interviews with writers appear in the Hay Festival's 30th-anniversary book Hay Festival Conversations.

He is a trustee of the Baillie Gifford Prize. He is a member of the Board of The Deborah Rogers Foundation. He was a governor of Fairfield High School in Peterchurch, Herefordshire, and a trustee of Hay Castle Trust.

He is a member of the European Festivals Association EFFE Jury.

He is an honorary fellow of The Royal Society of Literature.

Florence chaired the jury of the 2019 Man Booker Prize for Fiction, and notably defied the foundation's 1993-established rules to award the prize to two authors. Bernardine Evaristo - the first black woman to be awarded the prize - shared the prize with Margaret Atwood.

In late July 2021 Florence resigned as director of the Hay Festival following an independent investigation that upheld a complaint of bullying against Florence. He had been suspended in October 2020. Florence commented "I consider that my role had become untenable due to the conduct of the board and its insistence on holding a disciplinary hearing in my absence whilst I was off sick after a breakdown."

Personal life
Florence and his wife Becky Shaw have four sons. They live in Herefordshire. He is cousin to Trevor Jones.

Honours 
Florence was awarded an MBE in 2005 for services to Arts and Culture.

He was awarded a CBE in 2018 for services to Literature and Charity.

References

External links
 The Hay Festival Homepage
 BBC Radio 3 Private Passions - interview with Michael Berkeley, Sunday 27 May 2018.
 Prospect Magazine 11 Questions, 17 May 2018.
 Guardian op-ed - A Golden Age, Peter Florence on Hay's 30th Anniversary, 3 March 2017
 PEN International interview with Peter Florence, 6 June 2013.

1964 births
Living people
People educated at Ipswich School
Alumni of Jesus College, Cambridge
Commanders of the Order of the British Empire
Festival directors
Fellows of the Royal Society of Literature
People from Herefordshire